Central is an urban locality around Central railway station in Sydney, New South Wales, Australia. It is located in the Sydney central business district and is part of the local government area of the City of Sydney. The locality is in the inner-city suburbs of Surry Hills and Haymarket and is close to Chinatown. The postcode is 2000.

A bus interchange served by Transdev John Holland and Transit Systems services is located outside Central railway station in Eddy Avenue. Belmore Park, a famous gathering place in Sydney's history, is located opposite the railway station. Special events are often held in Belmore Park, such as Chinese New Year celebrations, which include animal lanterns.

Gallery 

Sydney localities